Guarani are a group of culturally-related indigenous peoples of South America. They are distinguished from the related Tupi by their use of the Guarani language. The traditional range of the Guarani people is in present-day Paraguay between the Paraná River and lower Paraguay River, the Misiones Province of Argentina, southern Brazil once as far east as Rio de Janeiro, and parts of Uruguay and Bolivia.

Although their demographic dominance of the region has been reduced by European colonisation and the commensurate rise of mestizos, there are contemporary Guarani populations in these areas. Most notably, the Guarani language, still widely spoken across traditional Guarani homelands, is one of the two official languages in Paraguay, the other one being Spanish. The language was once looked down upon by the upper and middle classes, but it is now often regarded with pride and serves as a symbol of national distinctiveness. The Paraguayan population learns Guarani both informally from social interaction and formally in public schools. In modern Spanish, Guarani also refers to any Paraguayan national in the same way that the French are sometimes called Gauls.

Name
The history and meaning of the name Guarani are subject to dispute. Before they encountered Europeans, the Guarani referred to themselves simply as Abá, meaning "men" or "people". The term Guarani was originally applied by early Jesuit missionaries to refer to natives who had accepted conversion to the Christian religion; Cayua or Caingua (ka'aguygua) was used to refer to those who had refused it. Cayua is roughly translated as "the ones from the jungle". While the term Cayua is sometimes still used to refer to settlements of indigenous peoples who have not well integrated into the dominant society, the modern usage of the name Guarani is generally extended to include all people of native origin regardless of societal status. Barbara Ganson writes that the name Guarani was given by the Spanish as it means "warrior" in the Tupi-Guarani dialect spoken there. Guarinĩ is attested in 12th-century Old Tupi, by Jesuit sources, as "war, warrior, to wage war, warlord".

History, myth and legend

Early Guarani villages often consisted of communal houses for 10 to 15 families. Communities were united by common interest and language, and tended to form tribal groups by dialect. It is estimated that the Guarani numbered some 400,000 people when they were first encountered by Europeans. At that time, they were sedentary and agricultural, subsisting largely on manioc, maize, wild game, and honey.

Equally little is known about early Guarani society and beliefs. They practiced a form of animistic pantheism, much of which has survived in the form of folklore and numerous myths. According to the Jesuit missionary Martin Dobrizhoffer, they practiced cannibalism at one point, perhaps as a funerary ritual, but later disposed of the dead in large jars placed inverted on the ground. Guarani mythology is still widespread in rural Paraguay.

Much Guarani myth and legend was compiled by the Universidad Nacional de Misiones in northern Argentina and published as Myths and Legends: A journey around the Guarani lands, Anthology in 1870 (translated into English language in 1906). Guarani myth and legend can roughly be divided into the following broad categories:

 Cosmogonic and eschatological myths; the creation and destruction of all things as dictated by Ñamandu "the true father, the first one". After him comes a pantheon of gods, chief among them Yporú who is more frequently known as Tupã. Jasy is another "good" deity who rules the night while Aña is a malign deity who dwells at the bottom of the Iguazu River.
 Animistic mythology, that is animals, plants and minerals being animated and capable of becoming anthropomorphic beings or in reverse the transmuted souls of people, either born or unborn, who have become animals, plants and minerals. The course of such anthropomorphism appears dictated by the pantheon of god-like deities because of their virtues or vices. Such animistic legends include that of the Lobizón, a werewolf type being, and the Mainumby or hummingbird who transports good spirits that are resident in flowers back to Tupá "so he can cherish them". Isondú or glowworms are the reincarnated spirits of certain people, as are the Panambi (butterflies). Ka'a Jarýi was a woman who became the sacred herb Yerba; Irupé was a woman who was turned into the giant lily because she fell in love with the moon.
 Pombero are goblin or elf like spirits who dwell in the forest and must be appeased. They have never been human. Principal among these is Jasy Jatere who has never been human and like all Pombero is from a different realm. His characteristics are vague and uncertain, and his powers badly defined as is the place where he resides. He is described in one legend as a "handsome, thickly bearded, blond dwarf" who is naked and lives in tree trunks. Other versions say he loves honey, his feet are backwards, and he is an "ugly, lame, old man". Most legends agree that he snatches children and "licks them", wrapping them in climbing plants or drowning them in rivers. To appease him gifts, such as honey, are left in places in the forest associated with him. Another Pombero is Kuarahy Jára who whistles like birds and is their protector. He can be your friend but is known for abducting young boys who are alone and trying to catch birds. If necessary he can take the form of a person, a tree or a hyacinth. Finally, Kurupi is a phallic mythological figure who will copulate with young women. He has scaly skin like a lizard, hypnotic eyes, and an enormous penis.

The sacred Iguazu Falls hold special significance for the Guarani and are the inspiration for numerous myths and legends. They reveal the sound of ancient battles at certain times, they are also the place where I-Yara—a malign Pomboro spirit—abducted Angá—a fair maiden—and hid her. The swallows that inhabit the falls to this day vainly search for her.

European contact
In 1537, Gonzalo de Mendoza traversed through Paraguay to about the present Brazilian frontier. On his return, he made acquaintance with the Guarani and founded the city of Asunción, later the capital of Paraguay. The first governor of the Spanish territory of Guayrá initiated a policy of intermarriage between European men and indigenous women; the descendants of these matches characterize the Paraguayan nation today. According to the Laws of the Indies slavery was forbidden by law in the Hispanic America.

The first two Jesuits, Father Barcena and Father Angulo, came to what is now the State of Paraná, Southern Brazil, in 1585, by land from the west. Others soon followed, and a Jesuit college was established at Asunción. In 1608, as a result of Jesuit protest against enslavement of the indigenous population, King Philip III of Spain gave authority to the Jesuits to convert and colonize the tribes of Guayrá. In the early period, the name Paraguay was loosely used to designate the entire river basin, including parts of what are now Uruguay, Argentina, Bolivia, and Brazil.

Exploring expeditions were accompanied by Franciscan friars. Early in the history of Asunción, Father Luis de Bolaños translated the catechism into the Guarani language and preached to Guarani people who resided in the area around the settlement. In 1588–89 St. Francis Solanus crossed the Chaco wilderness from Peru and stopped at Asunción, but gave no attention to the Guarani. His departure left the Jesuits alone with their missionary work, and to defend the natives against slave dealers. The Jesuit provincial Torres arrived in 1607, and "immediately placed himself at the head of those who had opposed the cruelties at all times exercised over the natives".

Cultural preservation
Today, the Guarani language is an official language of Paraguay, Bolivia, Argentina, and Mato Grosso do Sul in Brazil. As of 2012, an estimated 90% of the people in Paraguay spoke Guarani.

Slavery

The center depot of the slave trade was the town of São Paulo. Originally a rendezvous place for Portuguese and Dutch pirates, it later became a refuge for criminals, who mixed with Native American and African women and actively participated in the capturing and selling of Guaranis as slaves.

To oppose these armed and organized robbers, the tribes had only their bows and arrows. Many Guaranis were slain or enslaved by the slave-hunters active in Brazil during those years.

The Paraguayan Reductions

In 1607, Spanish King Philip III sent a letter to the governor of Rio de Plata Hernandarias de Saavedra to instruct him to send the newly arrived Jesuits to begin their missionary work. With Spanish royal protection, the first Guayrá mission, Loreto, was established on the Paranapanema by Father Joseph Cataldino and Father Simon Macerata in 1610. The Jesuit priest Father Ruiz de Montoya discussed the difficulties of spreading the missions and his interactions with the Guarani in his book The Spiritual Conquest. Ruiz de Montoya wrote that one of the Guarani caciques Miguel Artiguaye initially refused to join the missions until threatened by another Indigenous group. Artiguaye then returned to the mission and begged for protection.  As the mission provided the only real possible protection against enslavement, the Guarani flocked there in such numbers that twelve more missions were created in rapid succession, containing in all 40,000 Guaranis. The Jesuits were seen as intermediaries between the Spanish authorities and the Guarani caciques.  The Jesuit missions needed new converts and required workers to assist in the maintenance of the missions. The Guarani helped grow the crops to sustain the missions' populations and also produce goods to sell and trade to fund the missions.
Stimulated by this success, Father González and two companions journeyed to Uruguay and established two or three small missions in 1627. The local tribes killed the priests and the neophytes and burned the missions.

Slave raiders saw the Guarani missions as "merely an opportunity of capturing more Indians than usual at a haul". In 1629, an army of Paulistas surrounded the San Antonio mission, set fire to the church and other buildings, killed those who resisted or were too young or too old to travel, and carried the rest into slavery. San Miguel and Jesus Maria quickly met the same fate. Eventually, reinforcements gathered by Father Cataldino drove off the slavers. Within two years, all but two of the establishments were destroyed, and 60,000 Christian converts were carried off for sale to São Paulo and Rio de Janeiro. The attacks usually took place on Sunday, when the whole mission population was gathered for Mass. The priests were usually spared, but several were killed.

Only a few thousand natives were left of nearly 100,000 just before the Paulista invasion. Father Antonio Ruiz de Montoya purchased 10,000 cattle, and was able to convert the natives from farmers to stock raisers. Soon under Fathers Rançoncier and Romero the Uruguay missions were re-established. In 1632 the Mamelucos discovered a new line of attack from the south. In 1638, despite some successful resistance, all twelve of the missions beyond the Uruguay were abandoned and their people consolidated with the community of the Missions Territory. In the last raid Father Alfaro was killed.

In the same year Father Montoya, after having successfully opposed the attempts of the governor and the bishop of Asunción to reduce the natives' liberties and the mission administration, sailed for Europe. On this trip he was successful in obtaining letters from Pope Urban VIII forbidding the enslavement of the missionaries under the severest church penalties, and from King Philip IV of Spain, permitting Guaranis to carry firearms for defense and to be trained in their use by veteran soldiers who had become Jesuits.

When the next Paulista army, 800 strong, attacked the missions in 1641 they were met by a body of Christian Guarani armed with guns on the Acaray River. In two battles, the Paulista army suffered a defeat that warded off invasions for ten years. In 1651, the war between Spain and Portugal encouraged another Paulista attack to gain territory for Portugal. Before Spanish troops could arrive to help defend the missions, the fathers themselves led a Guarani army against the enemy. In 1732, at the time of their greatest prosperity, the Guarani missions were guarded by a well-drilled and well-equipped army of 7,000 Guaranis. On more than one occasion this mission army, accompanied by their priests, defended the Spanish colony.

In 1732, there were 30 Guarani missions with 141,252 converted Guaranis. Two years later a smallpox epidemic killed approximately 30,000 of them. In 1765, a second outbreak killed approximately 12,000 more, and then spread westward through the tribes of the Chaco.

Uruguay missions saved
In 1750, a treaty between Spain and Portugal (the Treaty of Madrid) transferred to Portugal the territory of the seven missions on the Uruguay, and the Guaranis were ordered to leave. They refused to leave, being familiar with the Portuguese as slave-hunters. Seven years of guerrilla warfare killed thousands of them (see Guarani War). The Jesuits secured a royal decree restoring the disputed mission territory to Spanish jurisdiction. Two missions in 1747 and a third in 1760 were established in the sub-tribe of the Itatínes, or Tobatines, in central Paraguay, far north of the older mission group. In one of these,  (founded 1747), Martin Dobrizhoffer ministered for eight years.

Jesuits expelled

In 1767, the Jesuits were expelled from Spanish dominions by royal edict. Fearing the outcome of this decision, viceroy Antonio María Bucareli y Ursúa entrusted the execution of the mandate in 1768 to two officers with a force of 500 troops. Despite their mission army of 14,000, the Jesuits submitted without resistance. Guarani caciques from Mission San Luis wrote a letter to the Governor of Buenos Aires on February 28, 1768, to ask for the Jesuits to stay. They wrote, "the fathers of the Company of Jesus know how to get along with us, and we with them, we are happy serving God and the King." The Guarani request was denied, but the letter highlights the value of the relationship the Jesuits and Guarani had established in the region.

Decline of the reductions

The missions were turned over to priests of other orders, chiefly Franciscans, but under a code of regulations drawn up by the viceroy and modeled largely on the Jesuit system. Under a chaotic political regulation, the missions rapidly declined. Most Guaranis returned to the countryside. According to the official census of 1801, fewer than 45,000 Guaranis remained; cattle, sheep, and horses had disappeared; the fields and orchards were overgrown or cut down, and the churches were in ruins. The long period of revolutionary struggle that followed completed the destruction. In 1814, the mission Indians numbered 8,000, and in 1848 the few who remained were declared citizens.

Aftermath
The relationship between the Guarani and the Jesuits sought to benefit both sides by allowing the Jesuits to grow their missionary presence in the region and giving the Guarani protections against enslavement. This relationship impacted the Guarani in the years after the Jesuit expulsion. The Guarani left the missions but some of them didn't go back to the forest or traditional ways. Instead they became what was called "Civilized Indians". Catholics and educated, the Guarani used the knowledge they learned from the Jesuits and became citizens working in various professions. When Jean Baptiste Debret came to Brazil in early 19th century, he encountered and painted numerous Guarani in Rio de Janeiro and the Southeast regions. Debret painted "Merchants in a Street", "A Soldier with two well dressed ladies", "A Wine producer", and "A Rich lady and her servant going to the Church". Debret's depicted wealthy Guarani living in Rio when the Portuguese Royal Family resided there and it was the capital of the Portuguese Empire. This shows that they influenced and participated in the formation of Brazil as an empire and later as a nation. But their identity as Guarani has been lost with time and forgotten by its descendants after generations.

A 2018 study in The Quarterly Journal of Economics found that "in areas of former Jesuit presence—within the Guarani area—educational attainment was higher and remains so (by 10–15%) 250 years later. These educational differences have also translated into incomes that are 10% higher today. The identification of the positive effect of the Guarani Jesuit missions emerges after comparing them with abandoned Jesuit missions and neighboring Franciscan Guarani missions. The enduring effects observed are consistent with transmission mechanisms of structural transformation, occupational specialization, and technology adoption in agriculture."

Eastern Bolivian Guarani

The Guarani people in Bolivia, called Chiriguanos, lived in the foothills of the Andes and had a different history than most other Guarani people.  Noted for their warlike character, the Chiriguanos were hostile in turn to the Inca Empire, the Spanish, and the independent state of Bolivia from the late 15th to the late 19th century.  The Jesuit missions had little success among the Chiriguanos, although Franciscans in the 19th century attracted numerous converts.  The Chririguanos were not finally pacified until the defeat in 1892 of forces led by their messianic leader Apiaguaiki Tumpa in the Battle of Kuruyuki.

Today

Argentina

Paraguay
The Guarani people and culture persist. Nearly all the forest tribes on the borders of Paraguay are Guarani. Many are descendants of mission exiles. In Paraguay, Guarani lineage predominates in the population and the Guarani language is spoken in most departments to this day.

Bolivia

The Eastern Bolivian Guarani, being one of many indigenous peoples in Bolivia, live in the Gran Chaco, near the Pilcomayo River, in  southeastern Bolivia close to the Paraguayan and Argentine borders, including portions of Santa Cruz, Chuquisaca, Tarija Departments. This region reaches nearly as far north as Santa Cruz de la Sierra and includes portions of the Guapay, Parapetí, and Ɨtɨka Guasu (or Pilcomayo) River valleys. The Bolivian Guarani are represented by the Assembly of the Guarani People. Some Guarani placenames in Bolivia: Yacuiba, Paraimiri, Itaimbeguasu, Tatarenda, Saipurú, Capirenda, Itay, Ibamiragera, Carandaytí, Ipaguasú, Abapó, Timboy, Caraparí, Urubichá, Kuruguakua, Guanay, Yaguarú and Rogagua.

There are three principal subgroups of Guarani in Bolivia, marked by dialectical and historical differences:
 Around fifty thousand Ava Guarani principally in the Andean foothills. Ava means man in Guarani, and thus Ava Guarani has become the name for numerous Guarani ethnic groups in Paraguay and Brazil.
 Simba (Quechua: braid) Guarani who live near the Pilcomayo River and have been identified by men maintaining a tradition of braided hair, although most young men no longer uphold this practice. They are sometimes called Guarani katui (Guarani: Guarani par excellence)
 The Izoceño Guarani or Tapɨi of Izozog who live in the region of Ɨsoso or Izozo on the Parapetí River

Language

The Guarani language has been much cultivated, its literature covering a wide range of subjects. Many works were written by priests, either wholly or partly in the native language, and were published by the mission press in Loreto. Among the most important treatises on the language are the "Tesoro de la Lengua Guarani" (Madrid, 1639) by Father Montoya, published in Paris and Leipzig in 1876; and the "Catecismo de la Lengua Guarani" of Father Diego Díaz de la Guerra (Madrid, 1630).

The language was also used by other tribes in regions like the Paraguayan Chaco and Northern Argentina.

The Guarani were later described, amongst many other historical documents in existence today, in 1903 by Croatian explorers Mirko and Stjepan Seljan. Several English words can be traced to Guarani roots, such as "tapioca", "toucan" and "jaguar."

Presently, the language is still the main binding characteristic of the Guarani people. The Argentinian communities speak mainly Mbya-Guarani, as opposed to the Tupi-Guarani and Guarani-Jopara spoken in Paraguay and Brazil. These varieties are mutually intelligible. The Guarani villages located in the south of Brazil and in the north of Argentina are more marginalized due to European immigration following the First and Second World Wars. Many Guarani do not speak Spanish and the European immigrant population does not speak Guarani. The Mbya-Guarani still live in secluded villages and only the "cacique" and some other officials in their community learn Spanish. Recently the government of Argentina has partly financed bilingual schools in the northern province of Misiones.

Paraguay is a bilingual country and most of its Spanish-speaking population also speaks a form of Guarani. The Paraguayan population learns Guarani both informally from social interaction and formally in public schools. Guarani became part of the required curriculum in public schools during the ten years since the ousting of dictator Alfredo Stroessner in 1989. The native populations in Paraguay speak the traditional Tupi-Guarani while the majority of bilingual Paraguayans speak Guarani-Jopara ("Jopara" meaning mixed). Many words have been borrowed from Spanish but include traditional Tupi-Guarani prefixes and suffixes. For example, "Nde rentede pa?" meaning "Do you understand?" The "entende" root is borrowed from the Spanish verb "entender" meaning "to understand." The evolution of Guarani-Jopara is very similar to "Border Spanish" or "Spanglish" where the mixture of the two languages begins to develop its own rules and uses. An understanding of both Guarani and Spanish is required for full fluency.

In August 2009 Bolivia launched a Guarani-language university at Kuruyuki in the southeastern province of Chuquisaca which will bear the name of the indigenous hero Apiaguaiki Tumpa. The education minister of Bolivia said that indigenous universities "will open up not only the Western and universal world of knowledge, but the knowledge of our own identity".

Today, the Standard Paraguayan Guarani is taught throughout the world;

North America: United States
South America: Argentina, Bolivia, Brazil, Uruguay
Europe: Spain, France, Switzerland, Germany, Italy, United Kingdom
Asia: Japan, Taiwan

Legacy

The Guarani had a great cultural influence on the countries they inhabited. In Paraguay the name is used like an ancestral nickname (like the French being called Gauls or the Puerto Ricans being called Boricua). In Brazil there are numerous football teams named Guarani, and there are also two in Argentina (both in Misiones) and one in Paraguay. The novel The Guarani is regarded as a foundational text of Brazilian Romanticism, and has been adapted twice to film. The young leader Sepé Tiaraju was immortalized by Brazilian writer Basílio da Gama in the epic poem O Uraguai (1769) and in the poem "O Lunar de Sepé", collected by Simões Lopes Neto and published in the beginning of the 20th century. Since then, he has been a character in many major literary works, like "O tempo e o vento" ["The time and the wind"], by Erico Verissimo. The expression and battle cry "Esta terra tem dono!" [This land has owners!"] is attributed to Sepé Tiaraju.

Santo Ângelo Airport, in Santo Ângelo, Rio Grande do Sul, Brazil, is named after Sepé Tiaraju.
Innumerable people, streets, neighborhoods, cities, rivers, animals, fruits, plants,  football clubs, companies in Brazil, Bolivia, Paraguay, Argentina and Uruguay are named in Guarani. The majority of the Brazilian states are named in Guarani also. Some Uruguayan cities named in Guarani: Tacuarembó, Pa'i Sandu, Chapicuy ("worn out"), Sarandí del Yí  Sarãndy del Y ("bushes of the Yí"), Balneario Iporá ("beautiful watering place"), El Ombú, Yacuy (Salto), Sarandí del Arapey Sarãndy del Árape'y ("bushes of the daily tasks river"), Sarandí Grande, Ituzaingó and Aiguá. The Guarani are depicted in films like The Mission and O Tempo e o Vento.

Guarani placenames in other countries:

Tupi-Guarani languages were spoken in almost all of South America, including its Northern part.

Venezuela 
Cabure, Aracua Ara kua ("the hole of the Ara (bird)"), Cagua, Maracay Mbarakaja'y ("kitten"), Aragua, Taguay, Yaguaratal, Caigua, Carapita, Yaguaracual, Taguapire, Carupano, Yaguaraparo, Carupe, Irapa  Yrapa ("all streams"), Tabay Táva'í ("small town"), Uracoa, Aragüita, Tucupita Tuku pytã ("red lobster"), Guarapo, Chaguaramas Jaguaráma ("land of jaguars"), Tuja, Cuyagua, Chivacoa, Urucure Urukure'a ("Burrowing owl"), Mucuragua, Cuara, Tucani Tukã'í ("small toucan"), Jacuque, Churuguara, Tacuato Taguato ("Falcon"), Aguay, Paraguaná Peninsula Paragua na ("crown-like or crown-shaped").
(Venezuelan states with Guarani-origin names; Apure Apyre ("Extremity, tip, end or border"), Aragua Ara gua ("The macaws Ara (bird)"), La Guaira  Guayraka ("Dolphin"), Yaracuy Jarara kúi ("falling Bothrops jararaca"))

Guyana 
Arakaka, Kariakay, Iguapa

Suriname 
Paramaribo Parama ývo ("down the sea"). (Referring to the Caribbean Sea, since although Suriname is part of the Caribbean, it is near the Amazon Delta, in the North Atlantic Ocean).

French Guiana 
Cayenne, the francization of the name Kỹiña ("mean chili pepper")

Colombia 
Buriticá Mburiti ka ("from Mauritia flexuosa"), Ituango, Apía, Ibagué yvakue ("fallen fruit or fruit peel"), Acuata, Arauca, Tibacuy, Mocoa, El Jagua, Iguambi, Itagüí, Yacare, Teranguara, Chachagüí, Puente Aranda, Catambuco, Aguayo

Panama 
Ipetí ypetĩ ("duck's beak")

 Nicaragua 
El Aguay Aguai  ("fruit tree")

 Ecuador 
Urcuqui, Timbuyacu, Ambuquí, Timbiré

 Peru 
Aguaytía Aguai'ty ("plantation of aguai"), Curiyaca, Imambari

The growing Paraguayan immigration to Argentina has led to a cultural enhancement of the Guarani peoples in Argentina. It can also be seen in Spain, due to the intense Paraguayan immigration to Spain

Many Guarani words were absorbed to every local language it coexisted with, for example; in Argentine-Uruguayan Spanish, Brazilian Portuguese, Bolivian Spanish or English.

Notable Guarani people

 Agustín Pío Barrios, renowned classical guitarist
 Juliana, a 16th century woman known for killing her Spanish master and urging other indigenous women to do the same
Sepé Tiarayú, Guarani War leader popularly venerated as a saint in Brazil and Argentina
 Manuel Ortiz Guerrero, poet

See also

 Guarana  (plant)
 Guaraní (currency)
 Guarani-Kaiowa
 Guarani mythology
 Guarani War
 Indigenous peoples in Brazil
 Jesuit Reductions
 Tupi people
 Encomienda
 Mapuche people
 Academy of the Guarani Language
 Indigenous peoples in Argentina

Notes

References
 

Further reading
Austin, Shawn Michae. (2015) "Guarani kinship and the encomienda community in colonial Paraguay, sixteenth and early seventeenth centuries", Colonial Latin American Review, 24:4, 545–571, DOI: 10.1080/10609164.2016.1150039

External links

 http://www.unavenirpourlesguaranis.org  – Campaign for the Guarani, French NGOs
Guarani Survival Fund – Fund opened by the British NGO Survival International in support of the Guarani
 Guarani, The Language of the People
 Catholic Encyclopedia article
Circuits of Culture: Media, Politics, and Identity in the Andes
 Indigenous peoples, and The Language (Spanish)
 Bolivian Indians see Rocky Exodus from Serfdom by the Associated Press'', January 2, 2010
 The Guarani – Survival International Charitable Trust

 
 
Indigenous peoples in Bolivia
Indigenous peoples in Paraguay
Indigenous peoples in Argentina
Indigenous peoples in Brazil
Indigenous peoples of South America
Indigenous peoples of the Gran Chaco
Ethnic groups in Paraguay
Jesuit Missions of the Guaranis
Indigenous peoples of the Amazon